John Franklin-Myers (born September 26, 1996) is an American football defensive end for the New York Jets of the National Football League (NFL). He played college football at Stephen F. Austin.

Early years
Franklin-Myers attended and played high school football at Greenville High School in Greenville, Texas.

College career
Franklin-Myers played college football for the Stephen F. Austin Lumberjacks.

Professional career

Los Angeles Rams
Franklin-Myers was drafted by the Los Angeles Rams in the fourth round (135th overall) of the 2018 NFL Draft. The pick used to draft him originally was acquired in a trade that sent Alec Ogletree to the New York Giants. He made his professional debut in the Rams' season opener against the Oakland Raiders. In Week 4, against the Minnesota Vikings, he recorded his first professional sack. He also recorded a sack and a fumble in Super Bowl LIII against New England Patriots Quarterback Tom Brady, though the fumble was quickly recovered by the Patriots offense.

Franklin-Myers was waived during final roster cuts on August 31, 2019.

New York Jets
On September 1, 2019, Franklin-Myers was claimed off waivers by the New York Jets. He was placed on injured reserve on October 4, 2019. He was designated for return from injured reserve on November 27, 2019, and began practicing with the team again. However, he was not activated by the end of the three-week practice window on December 18, 2019, and remained on injured reserve for the rest of the season.

On October 7, 2021, Franklin-Myers signed a four-year contract extension with the Jets for $55 million, with $30.2 million guaranteed.

References

External links
Stephen F. Austin Lumberjacks bio
John Franklin-Myers on Twitter

1996 births
Living people
Sportspeople from the Dallas–Fort Worth metroplex
Players of American football from Texas
American football defensive ends
People from Greenville, Texas
Stephen F. Austin Lumberjacks football players
Los Angeles Rams players
New York Jets players